James Mathias may refer to:

 James Goronwy Mathias (1842–1895), Baptist minister and writer
 James N. Mathias Jr. (born 1951), American politician in Maryland